Frantz's Bridge was a historic stone arch bridge located at Lowhill Township, Lehigh County, Pennsylvania. It crossed Jordan Creek.

It was listed on the National Register of Historic Places in 1988. During 2011, the bridge was replaced with a concrete one-span bridge.

References

External links 
 General view on the bridge as of October 2010
 Stone Bridge. October 2010
 Stone Bridge. October 2010

Road bridges on the National Register of Historic Places in Pennsylvania
Bridges completed in 1887
Bridges in Lehigh County, Pennsylvania
National Register of Historic Places in Lehigh County, Pennsylvania
Stone arch bridges in the United States
1887 establishments in Pennsylvania
2011 disestablishments in Pennsylvania